The Doctor Who Collectible Card Game is an out-of-print collectible card game published in 1996 by MMG Ltd and is based on the British television series Doctor Who. A total of 301 cards were released in the main set, plus 1 additional promotional card.

Gameplay
The Doctor Who Collectible Card Game is a game in which two players face off as Time Lords, and each plays creatures and resources in three time zones - past, present and future - using them to battle their opponents' creatures and destroy their Time cards, which represents a player's life energy. When all the Time cards are destroyed, that player loses. The game was described as playing three Magic: the Gathering games simultaneously.

Reception
Andy Butcher reviewed The Doctor Who Collectible Card Game for Arcane magazine, rating it a 4 out of 10 overall. Butcher comments that "The rules and mechanics of the game are derivative, borrowing heavily from Magic: The Gathering and a few other combat-based games. The card design is poor, with a tacky 70s style font, garish colours and some low-quality computer graphics. The idea of three battlefields is a good one, but other than that, Doctor Who has little to recommend it." According to Jane Frank, InQuest magazine reviewed it as the worst CCG ever, at that time.

References

Card games introduced in 1996
Collectible card games
Games based on Doctor Who